Lhakpa Tsamchoe (born 1972) is a Tibetan actress from India. She is the first Tibetan woman ever to break into mainstream film; most famous for starring alongside Brad Pitt and David Thewlis in the 1997 Hollywood blockbuster Seven Years in Tibet, in which she played Pema Lhaki, a Tibetan tailor and wife of Austrian mountaineer, Peter Aufschnaiter.

Career
In 1999, she starred in another French-made, American distributed Nepali adventure movie, Himalaya (French title:  Himalaya – l'enfance d'un chef), in which she was one of the leading characters. In 2006, in the Indian film Milarepa set in the Spiti Valley close to the border between India, Pakistan, and Tibet, she played a supporting role as Aunt Peydon during the formative years of the famed protagonist, Milarepa (1052–1135), who is one of the most widely known Tibetan saints.

Filmography

References

External links
 Lhakpa Tsamchoe Personal Website
 
 Tashi Dhondup: SEVEN YEARS IN TIBET -Discussion with Lhakpa Tsamchoe. Aesthetic (Boulder), May 2002

Living people
1972 births
People from Mysore district
Actresses from Karnataka
Female models from Karnataka
Indian film actresses
Tibetan actresses
Tibetan women
Indian people of Tibetan descent
21st-century Indian actresses